A Chabad house is a centre for disseminating traditional Judaism by the Chabad movement. Chabad houses are run by a Chabad Shaliach (emissary), and Shalucha (fem. for emissary) and their family. They are located in cities and on or near college campuses.

History 
Rabbi Menachem Mendel Schneerson (the Rebbe) sent Rabbi Shlomo Cunin to Los Angeles in 1965 by to lay the groundwork for Chabad's West Coast activities. The first Chabad house for university students was opened in March 1969 at the University of California, Los Angeles by Rabbi Cunin. A key to the Chabad house was given to the Rebbe and he asked if that meant that the new house was his home. He was told yes and he then replied, "My hand will be on the door of this house to keep it open twenty-four hours a day for young and old, men and women alike." 

In 1972, Rabbi Cunin opened additional Chabad houses at the University of California, Berkeley and University of California, San Diego and by 2003, Cunin had overseen the establishment of nearly 100 Chabad houses in California. 

Chabad houses are independently funded by the local community, apart from those in tourist destinations or Asian business hubs. Those on campus are funded initially by the parents, and then by the alumni when they become financially secure.

Description 
In a Chabad house, the Shaliach and Shlucha (rabbi and his wife) host programs, activities, and services for the local Jewish community and for tourists.

These centers exist today around the world, and serve as Jewish community centers that provide educational and outreach activities serving the needs of the entire Jewish community, regardless of degree of observance. Each center aims to provide a cozy and informal place to learn about and observe Judaism, and provides an atmosphere such that all Jews feel comfortable at Chabad events. Some are in or very near college campuses, others are not. 

Chabad houses are typically run by a Chabad rabbi and rebbetzin, often with the assistance of unmarried Chabad young men or women, or, in the case of more developed Chabad houses, with the assistance of a second or even third married couple.

Services 

Some typical Chabad house programs include: Hospital and prison visits; holiday activities such as "Sukkah Mobiles," Chanukah and Purim gift baskets and kits, holiday rallies and festivals; counseling and social Services; Jewish studies classes, lectures and seminars; Judaica services; regular newspapers and kosher meals. Classes may also be provided for non-Jews in the Noahide laws, as per rabbi Schneerson's Noahide campaign.

In universities 
Chabad houses in universities, known as Chabad on Campus, often provide housing for students, peer counseling and drug prevention centers, student activity offices, a synagogue, a publications center, library, kosher dining hall, student lounges, and a computer area. These facilities provide a social environment for young Jewish men and women on campus.

Gallery

See also 
 Chabad of Poway
 List of Chabad houses in California
 Nariman House
 Soho Synagogue
 Yeshiva Gedolah Frankfurt

Notes

References

Sources

External links 

 Chabad Lubavitch World Headquarters
 Chabad Lubavitch on the Web
 Chabad on Campus International

 
Chabad outreach